The TCU Horned Frogs men's tennis team represents Texas Christian University in NCAA Division I college tennis. The team is part of the Big 12 Conference and plays home matches at the Bayard H. Friedman Tennis Center in Fort Worth, Texas. The Horned Frogs are currently led by head coach David Roditi, who was a three-time All-American in his playing days at TCU.

History
TCU first fielded a varsity men's tennis team in 1974 under Bernard "Tut" Bartzen, who would go on to amass more than 500 victories in his 25 years as head coach.  The Frogs made their first NCAA Tournament appearance in 1977, led by All-American Randy Crawford.  Fifteen more Horned Frogs earned All-America honors under Bartzen, and twelve more teams made the NCAA Tournament - advancing as far as the national semifinals in 1989 and 1996.

Following Bartzen's retirement in 1998, the Frogs were led by a series of short-tenured coaches - Michael Center (1999-2000), Joey Rive (2001-2006) and Dave Borelli (2007-2010) - who combined to produce eleven NCAA Tournament appearances and five All-American players.

On September 7, 2010, TCU alum and three-time All-American David Roditi was named the program's 5th head coach.  The Frogs have made the NCAA Tournament in five of Roditi's first eight seasons back on campus, highlighted by a trip to the national semifinals in 2015 and three consecutive Big 12 regular season titles in 2016, 2017 and 2018. He also worked with the Big 12 to amend rules for spectator behavior, allowing for a more boisterous atmosphere at matches.  This has led to TCU becoming one of the nation's leading programs in terms of attendance.

All-Americans
 Randy Crawford (1977)
 David Pate (1981, 1982, 1983)
 Karl Richter (1981, 1982)
 Corey Wittenberg (1983)
 Tom Mercer (1986)
 Neil Broad (1987)
 Earl Zinn (1988)
 Clinton Banducci (1988, 1989)
 Eric Lingg (1989)
 Sandon Stolle (1990)
 Tony Bujan (1990, 1992)
 Luis Ruette (1990, 1991, 1992)
 Paul Robinson (1994, 1995, 1996)
 David Roditi (1994, 1995, 1996)
 Ashley Fisher (1996, 1997)
 Jason Weir-Smith (1996, 1997)
 Esteban Carril (1999, 2000, 2001)
 Trace Fielding (2001)
 Jimmy Haney (2001)
 Rafael Abreu (2006)
 Jordan Freitas (2006)
 Cameron Norrie (2015, 2016, 2017)
 Alex Rybakov (2017, 2018)
 Jerry Lopez (2017)
 Reese Stalder (2017)

Year-by-year results

References